Wickaman is a British drum and bass producer and DJ.

He has worked with many other producers including Adam F, Asnide Slide, DJ Hype, Hoodlum, J Majik, Mavrik, Mc Morgan, and RV.

His debut album was Dubplate Killaz (mixed by DJ Hype.)

In September 2008, the track "Crazy World" with J Majik entered the UK Top 40, peaking at number 37. He also made a drum & bass remix of Deadmau5's "I Remember" with J Majik.

In December 2014, he released the album "Bug in the Jungle Vol.1" under the label The Bughouse. The album features Wickaman, Hoodlum, Mc Fun, Golden, Mavrik, and Liption Mc.

References

British DJs
British record producers
Living people
Place of birth missing (living people)
Year of birth missing (living people)